Dwele  is a self-titled unofficial mixtape by the American R&B singer Dwele, released on February 24, 2009.

Track listing

References

Dwele albums